"Breakdown" is a song by South African rock band Seether. It is the third track and the third single from the band's third album, Finding Beauty in Negative Spaces. Shaun Morgan has stated that the song is about his former girlfriend Amy Lee, but other sources reference a more recent relationship. To further the point, Morgan has been quoted saying "Amy and I, at our worst moments, were still better than this last girl and I at our best moments". Morgan says that he did not anticipate "Breakdown" to be such a popular song; he wrote the song to air out his feelings. Morgan also says that Lee has influenced other Seether songs, as well. In addition, Morgan has also said that "The song is about not allowing yourself to be beaten down by what people say about you and kind of believing in yourself, and ultimately knowing that you'll be better for it".

The song was released to radio in the middle of August 2008 and quickly became one of the most added singles to active rock radio at the time.

Music video
The music video for "Breakdown" premiered on November 12, 2008, on Yahoo! Music. Tony Petrossian, who directed their previous videos for Fake It and Rise Above This, also made this video.

In the video, Jenna Westerbeck approaches Shaun, (who is seated) from behind, and he glances down at her touching him with obvious disdain. She then reaches her arms around and manipulates his head, which becomes a Rubik's Cube at her touch. Throughout the video, Shaun's face changes emotions in each cube, and as the video progresses, different people (including the rest of Seether) appear in the cube, lip-syncing to the background vocals. Towards the end of the bridge, the girl opens up the cube, removing blocks featuring other women. She then finds a block that features only her, and places it in the space for Shaun's eye. She then closes the box, gives it one last spin, and the cube effect disappears. She then walks out of frame as Morgan looks at her with a sense of distaste and disappointment.

This was the first video to feature the band's new lead guitarist Troy McLawhorn.

Song statistics 
 "Breakdown" has been played a total of 189 times (188 times by Seether, and one time by lead singer Shaun Morgan).
 The song was first performed in concert at The Rock Nightclub in Maplewood, Minnesota on October 8, 2007.
 The song was most recently performed in concert at The Stone Pony in Asbury Park, New Jersey on May 10, 2017.
 "Breakdown" was performed most often in 2009, 2011, and 2014, at 29 times. "Breakdown" was performed least often in 2007, at two times.

Charts

References

Seether songs
2008 singles
2007 songs
Song recordings produced by Howard Benson
Wind-up Records singles
Songs written by Dale Stewart
Songs written by Shaun Morgan
Songs written by John Humphrey (drummer)